Tap Roots is a 1948 Technicolor Western war film set during the American Civil War. It is very loosely based on the true life story of Newton Knight, a farm owner who attempted to secede Jones County from Mississippi.

Made by Walter Wanger Productions and Universal Pictures, it was directed by George Marshall and produced by Walter Wanger from a screenplay by Alan Le May, based on the 1942 novel Tap Roots by James H. Street, with additional dialogue by Lionel Wiggam. The original music was by Frank Skinner and the cinematography by Winton C. Hoch and Lionel Lindon.

The film stars Van Heflin and Susan Hayward with Boris Karloff, Julie London, Whitfield Connor, Ward Bond and Richard Long. Karloff plays a Choctaw Indian.

A radio version of Tap Roots, with Van Heflin, Susan Hayward and Richard Long reprising their film roles, was broadcast by the Lux Radio Theatre on September 27, 1948.

Plot 
A poor Mississippi farmer who has never owned slaves finds himself conscripted into the Confederate States Army to fight to defend the right of wealthy slaveowners to be able to maintain their grasp on their black property. After witnessing much deprivation and depravity, he deserts, returns home, and soon finds himself at the head of a band of former slaves, other Confederate deserters, and American Indians who had remained in Mississippi in defiance of the Indian Removal Act, fighting against the Confederacy and its sympathizers.

Cast
 Van Heflin as Keith Alexander
 Susan Hayward as Morna Dabney
 Boris Karloff as Tishomingo
 Julie London as Aven Dabney
 Whitfield Connor as Clay McIvor
 Ward Bond as Hoab Dabney
 Richard Long as Bruce Dabney
 Arthur Shields as Reverend Kirkland
 Griff Barnett as Dr. McIntosh
 Sondra Rodgers as Shellie Dabney
 Ruby Dandridge as Dabby
 Russell Simpson as Big Sam Dabney

Reception
Variety wrote that the film earned $2.5 million in rentals in the US.

The film recorded a loss of $380,385.

See also
 Boris Karloff filmography
 Free State of Jones

References

External links
 
 
 

1948 films
Universal Pictures films
Films based on American novels
American Civil War films
Films directed by George Marshall
Southern Unionists in the American Civil War
Films shot in North Carolina
Films shot in Tennessee
Films produced by Walter Wanger
American historical films
1940s historical films
Jones County, Mississippi
Films scored by Frank Skinner
American Western (genre) films
1948 Western (genre) films
1940s English-language films
1940s American films